Marília Atlético Clube, commonly referred to as Marília, is a Brazilian professional association football club based in Marília, São Paulo. The team competes in the Campeonato Paulista Série A3, the third tier of the São Paulo state football league.

Founded on April 12, 1942, their home stadium is the Bento de Abreu, with a capacity of 19,800. 

The club's home colours are sky blue and white and the team mascot is a tiger.

History
Marília was founded on April 12, 1942, as Esporte Clube Comercial. The club name was very unpopular, and on July 11, 1947,  a General Assembly changed the name of the club to Marília Atlético Clube.

On April 19, 1954, Marília took a leave of its official football activities. On July 7, 1969, Marília returned to its football activities.

Achievements
Campeonato Paulista Série A2: 2
1971, 2002

Stadium

Marília's stadium is Estádio Bento de Abreu, inaugurated in 1967, with a maximum capacity of 18,000 people.

Symbols and colors
Marília's mascot is a tiger, and was chosen in 1969, in a popular contest. The original colors of Marília were red and white.

Ultras
CCC (Comando Caipira da Capital)
FARC (Força Alvi Real Celeste)
Mancha Azul

Current squad
As of February, 2015

First-team staff

References

External links
Official Website

 
Association football clubs established in 1942
1942 establishments in Brazil
Marília
Football clubs in São Paulo (state)